is a Japanese actor.

Roles

Anime
Kaleido Star (Mute)
Mobile Suit Gundam Unicorn (Besson)
Moriarty the Patriot (Inspector Sturridge)
JoJo's Bizarre Adventure: Stone Ocean (Vincent van Gogh)
Yakitate!! Japan (Kai Suwabara)

Games
Ninja Blade (Ken Ogawa)
Sonic the Hedgehog (Mephiles)
Cross Edge (Judas)

Dubbing roles

Live-action
Jon Bernthal
The Walking Dead (Shane Walsh)
Fury (Grady "Coon-Ass" Travis)
Baby Driver (Griff)
Shot Caller (Frank "Shotgun")
The Punisher (Frank Castle / The Punisher)
Ford v Ferrari (Lee Iacocca)
Those Who Wish Me Dead (Ethan)
500 Days of Summer (Paul (Matthew Gray Gubler))
American Hustle (Mayor Carmine Polito (Jeremy Renner))
Awake (Dr. Jack Harper (Terrence Howard))
Back to the Future Part II (2018 BS Japan edition) (Fujitsu (Jim Ishida))
Big Miracle (Adam Carlson (John Krasinski))
Big Wolf on Campus (Tommy Dawkins (Brandon Quinn))
BlacKkKlansman (Detective Philip Zimmerman (Adam Driver))
Boy Erased (Victor Sykes (Joel Edgerton))
Captain Phillips (Shane Murphy (Michael Chernus))
D-War (Ethan Kendrick (Jason Behr))
Darkness Falls (Kyle Walsh (Chaney Kley))
The Day After Tomorrow (J.D. (Austin Nichols))
Dead Silence (Jamie Ashen (Ryan Kwanten))
Desperate Housewives (John Rowland (Jesse Metcalfe))
Dredd (Kay (Wood Harris))
Ex Machina (Nathan Bateman (Oscar Isaac))
F9 (Jack Toretto (J. D. Pardo))
The Family Stone (Ben Stone (Luke Wilson))
Firewall (2009 TV Asahi edition) (Willy (Vincent Gale))
First Man (Ed White (Jason Clarke))
Flight 93 (Mark Bingham (Ty Olsson))
Freedom Writers (Andre Bryant (Mario))
Harriet (John Tubman (Zackary Momoh))
Harry Potter and the Goblet of Fire (Viktor Krum (Stanislav Ianevski))
The Hurt Locker (Sergeant J. T. Sanborn (Anthony Mackie))
It's Complicated (Harley (John Krasinski))
John Carter (Kantos Kan (James Purefoy))
Jurassic World (2017 NTV edition) (Hamada (Brian Tee))
L.A.'s Finest (Ben Baines (Duane Martin))
Lakeview Terrace (Detective Javier Villareal (Jay Hernandez))
The Lord of the Rings: The Rings of Power (Durin IV (Owain Arthur))
Luther (DCI John Luther (Idris Elba))
Magnum P.I. (Thomas Magnum (Jay Hernandez))
The Marine series (Jake Carter (The Miz))
Martha Marcy May Marlene (Ted (Hugh Dancy))
Mission: Impossible III (Declan Gormley (Jonathan Rhys Meyers))
Monsters: Dark Continent (Frankie Maguire (Joe Dempsie))
Obi-Wan Kenobi (Kawlan Roken (O'Shea Jackson Jr.))
The Odd Life of Timothy Green (James Green (Joel Edgerton))
Once Upon a Time (Pinocchio / August Wayne Booth (Eion Bailey))
Open Graves (Jason (Mike Vogel))
Pay the Ghost (Detective Jordan Reynolds (Lyriq Bent))
The Player (Detective Cal Brown (Damon Gupton))
The Rocker (Curtis Powell (Teddy Geiger))
Roswell (Max Evans (Jason Behr))
The Ruins (Eric (Shawn Ashmore))
The Samaritan (Ethan (Luke Kirby))
Stargate: The Ark of Truth (Cameron "Cam" Mitchell (Ben Browder))
Stargate: Continuum (Cameron "Cam" Mitchell (Ben Browder))
Stranger Things (Bob Newby (Sean Astin))
Squid Game (Seong Gi-hun (Lee Jung-jae))
Top Gun (2005 NTV edition) (LTJG Sam "Merlin" Wells (Tim Robbins))
Unhinged (Tom Cooper (Russell Crowe))
Wander (Sheriff Luis Santiago (Raymond Cruz))
Warcraft (King Llane Wrynn (Dominic Cooper))
Wild Tales (Simón Fischer (Ricardo Darín))

Animation
Dragon Tales (Ord)

References

External links

1972 births
Living people
Japanese male child actors
Japanese male voice actors
Male voice actors from Chiba Prefecture
20th-century Japanese male actors
21st-century Japanese male actors
Production Baobab voice actors
Chiba University of Commerce alumni